The Canadian Newsmaker of the Year is a title awarded by The Canadian Press (CP) annually since 1946, based on a survey of editors and broadcasters across the country on which Canadian has had the most influence on the news in a given year.

Criteria
Canadian historian Chad Gaffield stated that the practice of recognizing a newsmaker of the year was a return to the study of how history can be influenced by one person, rather than studying obscure people.

The honour is often granted to politicians. Pierre Trudeau holds the record for most wins, receiving the distinction for the 10th time in 2000, breaking a tie with Lester B. Pearson's nine wins. Though it is generally a positive acknowledgement, it is not guaranteed to be such. In 1999 a newsmaker of the century was chosen in place of a newsmaker of the year, with candidates having to meet the standard of "lasting significance". Voters gave a mix of compliments and criticisms to the winner, Pierre Trudeau, who responded by noting that he was "at once surprised and quite pleased with the information."

List of Newsmakers of the Year

See also

 Canada: A People's History
Heritage Minutes
List of inductees of Canada's Walk of Fame
Persons of National Historic Significance
The Greatest Canadian

References

Canadian journalism
Canadian awards
Awards established in 1946